Benimakia rubens is a species of sea snail, a marine gastropod mollusc in the family Fasciolariidae, the spindle snails, the tulip snails and their allies.

Description
The shell grows to a length of 25 mm

Distribution
This species occurs in the Indian Ocean off Mauritius.

References

 Herbert, D.G. (1994). "A note on Peristernia zealandica (Kobelt in Küster & Kobelt, 1876) (Gastropoda: Fasciolariidae)" Journal of Conchology, Lond. 35: 125–129
 Snyder, M.A & Callomon, P. (2015). "Species named in Fasciolariidae by Tapparone-Canefri and their types (Mollusca: Gastropoda)". Proceedings of the Academy of Natural Sciences of Philadelphia. 164(1): 37–41.

External links
 Küster, H. C. & Kobelt, W. (1844-1876). Die geschwäntzen unbewehrten Purpurschnecken. Erste Hälfte: Turbinella und Fasciolaria. In Abbildungen nach der Natur mit Beschreibungen. Mollusca Gasteropoda: Purpuracea: Purpurschnecken; Dritte Abtheilung. Systematisches Conchylien-Cabinet von Martini und Chemnitz, ed.2
 Tapparone-Canefri, C. (1879). Museum Pauluccianum. Etudes malacologiques. Journal de Conchyliologie. 27(4): 316-327

Fasciolariidae
Gastropods described in 1876